The EF 28–300mm f/3.5–5.6L IS USM lens is a superzoom lens made by Canon Inc.

The lens has an EF-type mount, which fits the Canon EOS line of cameras.

When used on a digital EOS body with a field of view compensation factor of 1.3x, such as the Canon EOS-1D Mark III, it provides a narrow field of view, equivalent to a 36–390mm lens mounted on a 35mm frame body. With a 1.6x body such as the Canon EOS 400D, it provides a narrower field of view, equivalent to a 45–480mm lens mounted on a 35mm frame body.

This lens has a push-pull type zoom mechanism and can be used for many types of photography, because of its large focal length range. It is used mostly for press photography, and also for travel photography.

See also
Canon EOS
Canon EF lens mount
Canon L lens

References

External links

Canon EF lenses
Superzoom lenses
Camera lenses introduced in 2004